Benjamin Feindouno (born 17 February 1983) is a Guinean former professional footballer who played as a striker.

Career
Born in Conakry, Feindouno began his career with Hirondelles de Conakry. In 2000 he was scouted by AS Beauvais Oise where he played his only professional game on 10 May 2003 against FC Metz in the Ligue 2, he left in July 2003 to sign with FC Lorient where he played for the reserve team. After one year with FC Lorient B he signed with Vendée Poiré sur Vie on 1 July 2004.

On 7 August 2007, Feindouno left Vendée Poiré sur Vie and signed with FC Saint-Lô. After a successful year with Saint-Lô, in which he scored 14 goals and made 10 assists in the fifth tier, he signed a contract with fourth-tier side Vendée Luçon on 24 October 2008. In January 2009 he left Vendée Luçon to sign with La Roche VF.

Personal life
Benjamin is the brother of midfielders Simon Feindouno and Pascal Feindouno.

References

External links
 Foot-National.com Profile
 
 

1983 births
Living people
Sportspeople from Conakry
Association football forwards
Guinean footballers
FC Lorient players
Vendée Poiré-sur-Vie Football players
AS Beauvais Oise players
Luçon FC players
FC Saint-Lô Manche players
Guinean expatriate footballers
Guinean expatriate sportspeople in France
Expatriate footballers in France